Christin Ulrich (born 19 September 1990) is a German weightlifter, born in Schmalkalden. She competed at the 2012 Summer Olympics in the women's 58 kg, finishing in 13th, lifting 93 kg in the snatch and 114 kg in the clean and jerk, for a total of 207 kg.

References

External links 
 
 
 
 

German female weightlifters
Living people
Olympic weightlifters of Germany
Weightlifters at the 2012 Summer Olympics
1990 births
People from Schmalkalden
Sportspeople from Thuringia
21st-century German women